The 2020 Big Ten Conference men's soccer tournament was the 30th edition of the tournament. As the tournament champion, Indiana earned the Big Ten Conference's automatic berth into the 2020 NCAA Division I men's soccer tournament. 

Due to the COVID-19 pandemic, the tournament was rescheduled from November 2020 to April 2021, and reduced from nine teams to eight teams.

Seeding 

Seeding was determined by regular season conference record points per game.

Bracket

References

External links 
 Big Ten Conference Men's Soccer
 Big Ten Men's Soccer Tournament Central

Big Ten Men's Soccer Tournament
Big Ten Conference Men's Soccer
Big Ten Conference Men's Soccer
Big Ten Conference Men's Soccer
Big Ten Conference Men's Soccer
Big Ten Conference Men's Soccer Tournament
Big Ten